Huang Ching-ya (born ) is a Taiwanese politician and former flight attendant of TransAsia Airways.

Biography 
Huang was born in Kaohsiung and received a bachelor's degree from National Taitung University.

In 2015, Huang survived the crash of TransAsia Airways Flight 235, the only crew member to do so.

In 2022, Huang joined the Taiwan Statebuilding Party (TSP), registering in the tenth electoral district of Kaohsiung City (Cianjhen District and Siaogang District), and ran in the 2022 Taiwanese city and county council elections, but lost by 7,634 votes. She withdrew from the TSP two days later.

Personal life 
Huang is married to Chiu Hsien-chun, a member of the Democratic Progressive Party and former aide to Cheng Yun-peng. They have a daughter.

References

External links 

 
 

Flight attendants
Survivors of aviation accidents or incidents
People from Kaohsiung
1988 births
Living people